La Chapelle is a Baptist Evangelical multi-site church based in Montreal, Canada. It is affiliated with Canadian National Baptist Convention. The senior pastor is David Pothier.

History
The church was founded in 2013 by Pastor David Pothier.   In 2014, it had 750 people. 
In 2018, the church had 5 services and 1,500 people. In 2020, it had opened 4 campuses in different cities in Quebec.

Beliefs 
The Church is a member of the Canadian National Baptist Convention.

Social Programs 
The Church founded the organization "J'aime ma ville", which offers, among other things, a food bank, a sponsorship program for newcomers and weeks of involvement in the community.

See also

 List of the largest evangelical churches
 List of the largest evangelical church auditoriums
 Worship service (evangelicalism)

References and notes

External links

Baptist multisite churches
Baptist churches in Canada
Churches in Montreal